The Chery Q21 or Karry Youpai (优派) and Chery Q21D or Karry Yousheng (优胜) is a commercial minivan produced by Karry (开瑞汽车), a sub-brand of the Chery brand for making commercial vans, trucks, SUVs, and mini-MPV's, which are mostly sold in third and fourth-tier cities and the countryside in China.

Overview

The original Chery Q21 was launched in 2009 and was sold under the Karry brand as the Karry Youpai (优派), and a long wheelbase version called the Chery Q21D was also sold under the Karry brand as the Karry Yousheng (优胜).

See also
Chery

References

External links
 Karry Auto Official Website

Youpai|Yousheng
Compact MPVs
Cars introduced in 2009
Cars of China